Build Up is the solo debut by Rita Lee, originally released in 1970 during her time with Os Mutantes. Despite the moderate success of the single "José (Joseph)", the album failed to captivate listeners in Brazil. Due to the revived interest in Os Mutantes, the album has since gained a cult following in recent years with many considering it be one of her finest efforts.

Track listing

Personnel
 Rita Lee: vocals

Special guests:
 Rogério Duprat - orchestral arrangements
 Os Mutantes
 Alexander Gordin (Lanny Gordin) - guitar
 Diogenes - drums
 Sergio - bass guitar

References

1970 debut albums
Rita Lee albums
Polydor Records albums
Portuguese-language albums
Albums produced by Arnaldo Baptista
Albums produced by Rogério Duprat